McLaughlin Run is a  long 2nd order tributary to Chartiers Creek in Allegheny County, Pennsylvania.

Variant names
According to the Geographic Names Information System, it has also been known historically as:
McLaughlin's Run

Course
McLaughlin Run rises in Bethel Park, Pennsylvania and then flows northwesterly to join Chartiers Creek in Bridgeville.

Watershed
McLaughlin Run drains  of area, receives about 39.1 in/year of precipitation, has a wetness index of 351.90, and is about 9% forested.

See also
 List of rivers of Pennsylvania

References

Rivers of Pennsylvania
Rivers of Allegheny County, Pennsylvania